Mohsen Sorkhou is an Iranian reformist politician who currently serves as a member of the City Council of Tehran and head of its head of Labor fraction.

References
 Biography

1956 births
Living people
Islamic Labour Party politicians
Worker House members
Tehran Councillors 2013–2017